Krasimir Stefanov (born 1 February 1949) is a Bulgarian wrestler. He competed in the men's Greco-Roman 57 kg at the 1976 Summer Olympics.

References

1949 births
Living people
Bulgarian male sport wrestlers
Olympic wrestlers of Bulgaria
Wrestlers at the 1976 Summer Olympics
Place of birth missing (living people)